Elections for the members of the House of Representatives were held on June 2, 1925 pursuant to the Philippine Organic Act of 1902 which prescribed elections for every three years. The ruling Nacionalista Party, which was split into Colectivista and Unipersonalista factions in 1922, were reconciled and were named as the Nacionalista Consolidado Party. The party continued their hold of the House of Representatives retaining their number of seats from the previous election, and the majority.

Results
{| width=69% 
|-
|+ ↓
|-align=center
|
|-
|

Note

A.  The combined number of seats of the Nacionalista Consolidado after the two factions merged back together.

References

  

1925
History of the Philippines (1898–1946)
1925 elections in Asia
1925 in the Philippines